CISN may refer to:

 California Integrated Seismic Network
 CISN-FM, a radio station in Edmonton, Alberta, Canada